The Outlaw is a wooden roller coaster located at Adventureland in Altoona, Iowa, near Des Moines.

The Outlaw made its debut in 1993. It was the second roller coaster built by Custom Coasters International, which soon became known as one of the world's premier builders of wooden roller coasters.

The original spokesperson for The Outlaw was an old miner character who appeared in television, radio, and print advertisements for Adventureland.  He can still be seen outside the lower queue of The Outlaw in cartoon representation, on the "you must be this tall to ride" sign.

The "Prototype" for Great Coasters International
Even though Outlaw was built by CCI, it was designed by Mike Boodley, who later went on to form Great Coasters International.  In fact, Outlaw is considered to be the prototype GCI roller coaster as it laid the groundwork for coasters like Lightning Racer and Kentucky Rumbler.

References

Roller coasters introduced in 1993
Roller coasters in Iowa
Western (genre) amusement rides